Maxim Leitsch (born 18 May 1998) is a German professional footballer who plays as a centre-back for Bundesliga club Mainz 05.

Club career
On 20 May 2022, Leitsch signed a contract with Mainz 05.

Career statistics

References

External links

Profile at the 1. FSV Mainz 05 website 

Living people
1998 births
Footballers from Essen
German footballers
Association football defenders
Germany youth international footballers
Germany under-21 international footballers
Bundesliga players
2. Bundesliga players
VfL Bochum players
1. FSV Mainz 05 players